Tyreece is a given name. Notable people with the name include:

Tyreece John-Jules (born 2001), English footballer
Tyreece Kennedy-Williams (born 2000), English footballer
Tyreece Simpson (born 2002), English footballer

See also
Tyrece Radford (born 1999), U.S. basketball player
Tyreese
Tyrese (disambiguation)

Masculine given names